You'd Prefer an Astronaut is the third studio album by the American alternative rock band Hum, released on April 11, 1995, by RCA Records as their major label debut. The title of the album is a lyric lifted from the song "I'd Like Your Hair Long".

The album has sold over 250,000 copies since its release, mostly due to the second single from the album, "Stars". It became Hum's highest charting song, reaching 11 on Hot Modern Rock Tracks and 28 on Hot Mainstream Rock Tracks; it regained popularity a decade later after being featured in a Cadillac commercial with actress Kate Walsh. The song and its video were also featured on the television show Beavis and Butt-Head.

The album spawned two other singles, "The Pod" and "I'd Like Your Hair Long", although neither received the commercial success of "Stars".

Legacy
Discussing You'd Prefer an Astronaut, Deftones frontman Chino Moreno said, "This is a heavy record, and it's where Deftones get a big part of our influence from, tone-wise."

In 2016, Sam Blum of The A.V. Club listed the album as an overlooked masterpiece.

Track listing
"Little Dipper" – 4:44
"The Pod" – 4:38
"Stars" – 5:09
"Suicide Machine" – 5:58
"The Very Old Man" – 2:45
"Why I Like the Robins" – 4:58
"I'd Like Your Hair Long" – 5:26
"I Hate It Too" – 5:59
"Songs of Farewell and Departure" – 6:16

Personnel
Hum
Jeff Dimpsey – bass guitar
Tim Lash – guitar
Bryan St. Pere – drums
Matt Talbott – guitar and vocals

Technical
Keith Cleversley – production

References

External links
Cleversly on getting the guitar sound for the album

1995 albums
Hum (band) albums
RCA Records albums